Gerard "Nig" Lipscomb (February 24, 1911 – February 27, 1978) was an American professional baseball infielder during 1933–1947. He played in 36 games for the St. Louis Browns of Major League Baseball in 1937, primarily as a second baseman. Lipscomb was one of several baseball players in the first half of the 20th century to be nicknamed "Nig".

External links

1911 births
1978 deaths
People from Rutherfordton, North Carolina
Major League Baseball second basemen
Baseball players from North Carolina
St. Louis Browns players
Charlotte Hornets (baseball) players
Atlanta Crackers players
New Orleans Pelicans (baseball) players
Little Rock Travelers players
Greenwood Crackers players
Charleston Rebels players
Zanesville Cubs players
Buffalo Bisons (minor league) players
Louisville Colonels players
Williamsport Grays players
Greensboro Patriots players
Concord Weavers players